24-hour race may refer to:

24 hour mountain bike races
24-hour run, a form of ultramarathon
Endurance racing (motorsport)